

Countess of Orléans

Merovingian countesses 
NN, wife of Count Willachar and the mother Chalde of Orléans, wife of Chramn son of King Chlothar I.

Carolingian countesses

Capetian countesses

Duchess of Orléans

House of Valois

First creation

Second creation

Third creation

House of Bourbon

Fourth creation 
None

Fifth creation

House of Orléans

Sixth creation

Notes

References
CENTRAL FRANCE - VICOMTES d'ORLEANS

Other links
Dauphine and Princess of France
Duchess of Valois
Duchess of Chartres
Duchess of Montpensier
Duchess of Châtellerault
Dauphine of Auvergne
Princess of Joinville
Duchess of Anjou
Duchess of Guise
Duchess of Penthièvre
Duchess of Galliera
Duchess of Vendôme
Duchess of Aumale
Duchess of Angoulême
Duchess of Alençon
Duchess of Étampes
Duchess of Saint-Fargeau
Countess of Évreux
Countess of Eu
Countess of Clermont
Countess of La Marche
Dauphine of Auvergne

See also

Orleans, consorts
Orleans, consorts
Orleans, consorts
 
 
 
Orleans, consorts
Women of medieval France
Consorts, Orleans
Consorts, Orleans
Consorts, Orleans
Consorts, Orleans
Consorts, Orleans
Consorts, Orleans
Orleans, consorts
Orleans, consorts
Orleans, consorts
Orleans, consorts
Orleans, consorts
Orleans, List of royal consorts of